Hrušica Peak (in older sources also Rožčica;) is a peak in the Western Karawanks between Dovška Baba and Mount Klek.

References

External links
 Information about Hrušica Peak on Hribi.net

Mountains of Upper Carniola
One-thousanders of Slovenia
Mountains of the Alps